Swinfen is a community in England.

Swinfen may also refer to:

 Swinfen and Packington, a civil parish in Staffordshire, England
 Swinfen v. Swinfen, a series of English trials over the will of Samuel Swynfen
 Baron Swinfen, a title in the Peerage of the United Kingdom
 Charles Swinfen Eady, 1st Baron Swinfen (1851–1919), British lawyer and judge
 John Swinfen (1613–1694), English politician
 Michael Swinfen-Broun (1858–1948), English soldier, magistrate, High Sheriff and Deputy Lieutenant
 Reg Swinfen (1915–1996), English footballer